is a Japanese politician.

Overviews 

Born in Edogawa, Tokyo, he graduated from the Faculty of Politics & Economics at Gakushuin University in 1956 and then entered ENEOS, a Japanese oil company.  He also worked as an aide to the Head of the Defense Agency until running successfully for the House of Representatives in 1976 as a member of the Liberal Democratic Party.

He served as the Minister of Education for Prime Minister Tomiichi Murayama in 1995, a Socialist administration.  He was appointed the Minister of Agriculture, Forestry and Fisheries in 1997 and served in that position until 2000 when he was defeated in his reelection campaign.  He ran again in 2003 and was elected, and was once again appointed the Minister of Agriculture, Forestry and Fisheries in 2004 by Prime Minister Junichiro Koizumi.

He opposed the Prime Minister's motion to dissolve the House of Representatives following the defeat of the government's postal privatization bill and was forced to resign in August 2005, prior to the 2005 Japanese general election.

External links 
 http://www.kantei.go.jp/foreign/koizumidaijin/040927/08shimamura_e.html

1934 births
People from Edogawa, Tokyo
Living people
Gakushuin University alumni
Members of the House of Representatives from Tokyo
Ministers of Agriculture, Forestry and Fisheries of Japan
Education ministers of Japan
Liberal Democratic Party (Japan) politicians
21st-century Japanese politicians